Cheryl Stearns (born 14 July 1955) is an American skydiver.

She won the bronze medal in Women's Overall Individual Style and Accuracy at the XXV World Parachuting Championships in Japan in 2000.

Life
She received her education from Embry Riddle Aeronautical University in 1985. She would go onto winning the gold medal in the category "Overall, Women" in 1978 and 1994. She holds the record for the most total parachute jumps made by a woman - 21,000 jumps as of June 14, 2019. She also holds the record for most parachute jumps made in a 24-hour period by a woman - 352 jumps from November 8–9, 1995.

More recently, Stearns was involved in the StratoQuest project, which endeavored to break Joseph Kittinger's long-standing record for the highest altitude parachute jump ever, with a jump from at least 110,000 feet.

Stearns made her first jump in 1971 at the age of 17.

In 1977 she became the first female member of the Golden Knights, the U.S. Army's elite parachute team. She served two three-year tours. She served two active duty hitches with the Golden Knights in her military career. She retired from the army after 29 years of service as a master sergeant.

 she was an on-call pilot for US Airways.

References

External links

1950s births
Living people
American skydivers
United States Army non-commissioned officers
Women in the United States Army
Competitors at the 2001 World Games